Arbër Aliu (13 January 1988 – 29 June 2019) was an Albanian footballer. He last played as a defender for KF Erzeni. He died on 29 June 2019 after a personal watercraft accident.

Club career
Before joining KF Erzeni, he was playing for KF Tërbuni Pukë in the Albanian Superliga, and was previously on the books of Partizani Tirana.

References

1988 births
2019 deaths
Footballers from Durrës
Albanian footballers
Association football defenders
FK Partizani Tirana players
FC Kamza players
KS Turbina Cërrik players
KF Skënderbeu Korçë players
KF Tërbuni Pukë players
KF Erzeni players